Rajith CR, better known as Rajith Menon, is an Indian actor who made his debut through the 2007 Malayalam movie Goal.

Personal life

Rajith Menon did his schooling in Abu Dhabi Model School, and continued his bachelor's degree in mechanical engineering at St. Joseph's College of Engineering in Chennai, Tamil Nadu, India. He has also pursued MBA in HR from Sikkim Manipal University.

Career
Rajith Menon's debut was Goal. While watching the shooting of Kamal's Karutha Pakshikal, he was handpicked by an assistant to Kamal to play the lead role in Goal. He received the "Asianet Best New Face Award" for this film. He was lucky to work with all major filmmakers, he was cast in films directed by I.V. Sasi, Joshiy, Kamal, Rajasenan and T.K. Rajeevkumar.

He made his Tamil film debut in 2014 with Vikraman's Ninaithathu Yaaro in which he played an assistant director in the film.

He made his Telugu debut through the film Dhamki directed by Chinna Aenuganti.He is currently shooting for his second Telugu film, Sreerama Raksha, directed by Ramanujan Elu.

Apart from films, Rajith has endorsed and been part of numerous commercials/ads.

Direction 
In all the interviews he has mentioned that direction is his passion and aim.
Following this passion, he debuted into direction with music video "Love Policy" starring Aju Varghese and Shritha Sivadas with Govind Padmasoorya Bhagath Manuel doing cameo roles and was Sony Music second venture in kerala.This music video had music by Sreejith-Saachin of yuvhh fame and was sung by Sooraj Santhosh and Remya Nambeesan .it went on to become one of the top trending music videos in YouTube.

Second music video was a dedication to motherhood titled "Anbendraale Amma" in Tamil and "With Love Maa" in Hindi and had the gorgeous Zarina Wahab in the lead role.Distributed by Times music, music by Renjith unni and sung by Shweta Mohan and Saptaparna Chakraborty respectively. This went on to become an instant hit and viral and everyone praised for the heart touching theme taken and direction.

Rajith's directorial Tamil short film titled “My Death Certificate” has won numerous awards and accolades at many Indian and international film festivals with unanimous critical response and reviews.

He is also the managing director of an ad agency called "Arvy Productions" and is currently directing ads.

Filmography

Awards 

Best Newcomer - Asianet Awards

Best New Talent - Chennai Film Awards

References 
Rajith Menon's Photos

External links 
 

Male actors in Tamil cinema
Living people
1988 births
Male actors from Thrissur
Male actors in Malayalam cinema
Indian male film actors
21st-century Indian male actors
Male actors in Telugu cinema